The 2008 Women's World Open Squash Championship is the women's edition of the World Open, which serves as the individual world championship for squash players. The event took place at the National Squash Centre in Manchester, England from 11 to 19 October 2008.

Ranking points
In 2008, the points breakdown were as follows:

Seeds

Draw and results

Note: * Q = Qualifier, * WC = Wild Card, * w/o = Walkover, * r = Retired

See also
World Open
2008 Men's World Open Squash Championship
2008 Women's World Team Squash Championships

References

External links

World Squash Championships
W
W
2008 in English sport
Squash in England
Squash tournaments in the United Kingdom
International sports competitions in Manchester
2008 in women's squash